Kokia cookei is a small, deciduous tree commonly known as the kokio, Molokai treecotton, Cooke's kokio, or Molokai kokio.

Distribution
This species is only known to have existed in the lowlands of western Molokai island of the Hawaiian Islands. Presumably, its native habitat was lowland dry forests on the leeward western end of the island. This was all but cut down by Polynesian settlers about the year 1000 CE to make room for agriculture. It seems to have been noted by these settlers, as suggested by the native name hau heleula ("entirely red hau"). The three trees initially found grew near Mahana, northeast of Puu Nana. at approximately  elevation.'Although the original forest ecosystem was destroyed and replaced by shrubland with plants like native iliee (Plumbago zeylanica) and introduced flora, Molokai kokio survived initially. It seems to have had some tolerance to habitat change, enabling it to hang on until the 19th century.

Conservation
It is considered one of the rarest and most endangered plant species in the world. Even when first found in the 1860s, only three trees could be located. It was presumed extinct in the 1950s when the last surviving seedling perished. However, in 1970, a single plant was discovered on the same Kauluwai estate where the "last" individual grew, presumably a surviving relict of one of the plants previously cultivated there. Although this tree was destroyed in a fire in 1978, a branch that was removed earlier was grafted onto the related, and also endangered, Kokia kauaiensis. Currently there exist about 23 grafted plants.

Putative pollinators
Its eventual extinction in wild state of the species seems for a large part due to coextinction with native nectarivorous birds. K. cookei seems to be adapted to bird pollination like most related Malvaceae. The birds, Drepanidinae, were extirpated from dryland forest by Polynesians, and most remaining species entirely succumbed to mosquito-borne diseases like avian malaria (Plasmodium relictum)  and fowlpox in the 19th century.

The wide, large flowers of Molokai kokio would have admitted a wide range of potential pollinators (as opposed to e.g. Hibiscadelphus):

 Maui Nui alauahio, Paroreomyza montana ssp? – extirpated from island (prehistorically?)
 Kākāwahie, Paroreomyza flammea – extirpated from lowlands by 1900, extinct (1963)
 Common amakihi, Hemignathus virens – extirpated from lowlands by 1900
 Iiwi, Vestiaria coccinea – extirpated from lowlands by 1900
 Black mamo, Drepanis funerea – extinct (1907); not certain if it regularly occurred in habitat
 Apapane, Himatione sanguinea – extirpated from lowlands by 1900
 Akohekohe, Palmeria dolei – extirpated from island (1907); not certain if it regularly occurred in habitat

Of these, the Iiwi was perhaps the most important, given that the other species are/were all either smallish and short-billed (K. cookei'' has quite large flowers), or did probably not occur in its habitat in significant numbers.

See also

References

External links

 Botany.hawaii.edu: Photo of flower and leaf

cookei
Endemic flora of Hawaii
Biota of Molokai
Extinct flora of Hawaii
Plants extinct in the wild
Plants described in 1934